Flashlight fish is a common name for several fish and may refer to:

Anomalopidae, a family known as the flashlight fishes, with many species referred to as flashlight fish, especially
Anomalops katoptron, from the Pacific Ocean
Photoblepharon palpebratum, from the eastern Indian Ocean and the Pacific
Photoblepharon steinitzi, from the western Indian Ocean
Myctophidae, a family sometimes known as flashlight fishes, with some species referred to as flashlight fish
Electrona risso (chubby flashlight fish), found in oceans around the world
Protomyctophum crockeri, found in the North Pacific
Spotted lantern fish (Myctophum punctatum), found in deep waters of the Atlantic and Mediterranean Sea
Stomiidae, a family with species referred to as flashlight fish
Photostomias, found in deep waters